The South Whidbey Record is a newspaper based in Langley, Washington, United States. It publishes Wednesdays and Saturdays. The paper started as the  Whidby Record and later changed its name in the 1940s to The Whidbey Record when the proper spelling of the island's namesake, Joseph Whidbey, was discovered to have an "e" in it. The paper adopted its present name in 1981. The Examiner won awards from the Suburban Newspapers of America in 2004, 2005, and 2008.

By 2013, it was owned by Sound Publishing. The company owns two other papers on Whidbey Island, the Whidbey Examiner and the Whidbey News-Times; the three papers, which previously competed with one another, shared a single publisher, Kasia Pierzga, a founder of the Examiner, until 2013, when she was succeeded by Kevin Graves. Its circulation has been estimated at about 4,500.

In 1989 its circulation was reported at 3,100.

A series of winter storms in 2006–07 caused more than nine power outages on Whidbey Island, which challenged the paper's operations, but Sound Publishing was able to maintain its production schedule.

References

External links 
 Chronicling America entry

Newspapers published in Washington (state)
Island County, Washington